Ocularia quentini is a species of beetle in the family Cerambycidae. It was described by Stephan von Breuning in 1960. It is known from the Ivory Coast.

References

Endemic fauna of Ivory Coast
Oculariini
Beetles described in 1960
Taxa named by Stephan von Breuning (entomologist)